Bickford is a village in Staffordshire, England. For population details taken at the 2011 census see Penkridge

See also
Listed buildings in Penkridge

External links

Villages in Staffordshire
Penkridge